Viji Chandrasekhar is an Indian actress. She has appeared in several Tamil, Malayalam, Telugu and Kannada films. She  played the female lead role in Arohanam which had won several awards. She is known for her roles and she has also featured in television serials. She played the main lead in Azhagi, a television serial.

Career
Viji's sister is actress Saritha, who was already a star when Viji made her debut as the sister of Rajinikanth's character in the 1981 comedy film Thillu Mullu by K. Balachander. Despite the film becoming a success, Viji chose to concentrate on her studies and refrained from acting until the 1990s.

Besides performing supporting roles in films including K. Balachander's Paarthale Paravasam (2001) as the sister of Raghava Lawrence and in Mani Ratnam's Aaytha Ezhuthu (2004) as the sister of Krishna's character, she mainly worked in television serials. In over 20 years, she was part of over 35 serials. In 2012, she played Nirmala, a vegetable vendor affected by bipolar disorder in Lakshmi Ramakrishnan's Aarohanam, and won critical acclaim for her performance. A critic from Sify.com noted: "in an author backed role, Viji Chandrasekhar steals the show as she is the pivot around which the film revolves."

Filmography

Television

Web series

Reality shows

Short films

References

External links
 
 

Living people
Actresses in Tamil cinema
Indian film actresses
Actresses in Malayalam cinema
Actresses in Tamil television
Actresses in Kannada cinema
Actresses in Telugu cinema
Year of birth missing (living people)